Edward "Eds" Daniel Chesters (born 24 October 1970 in Bishop Auckland, County Durham) is an English drummer, currently living in West London and best known as a member of The Bluetones. He also works as a mobile osteopath in Ealing and is a member of the Institute of Osteopathy and registered with the General Osteopathic Council.

Prior to joining the Bluetones, Chesters played drums in Soho. The band were best known for "Hippychick", a top-ten single in the UK Singles Chart in 1991 which sampled the guitar riff from "How Soon Is Now?" by The Smiths.

References

1970 births
Living people
English songwriters
English rock drummers
The Bluetones members
People from Bishop Auckland
Musicians from County Durham
People from Durham, England
People from Hounslow
Britpop musicians
21st-century drummers